Onyeama Francis Okechukwu is a Nigerian professional footballer who currently plays for Churchill Brothers in the I-League.

Personal life and career
Francis was born in Nigeria on 13 April 1991. He started his career in the youth team in Nigeria.

Francis Okechukwu came to India. He has played for clubs like Southern Samity, Railway FC, United S.C., and Peerless in the Calcutta Football League and I-League 2nd Division. He also represented Tezpur United FC and Sunrise Athletic Club in the Assam Football League. He also played for Hindustan Eagles FC in Chennai.

In 2018, he signed for Churchill Brothers in the 2017-18 I-League Season. He scored in the debut game against Gokulam FC and helped the team to draw against Gokulam FC.

References 

1991 births
Living people
People from Aba, Abia
Nigerian footballers
Nigerian expatriate footballers
Expatriate footballers in India
Churchill Brothers FC Goa players
Association football forwards
Peerless SC players